Hymenobacter rufus is a Gram-negative and rod-shaped bacterium from the genus of Hymenobacter which has been isolated from soil from Jeollabuk-do in Korea.

References 

rufus
Bacteria described in 2018